Tomáš Garrigue Masaryk is an outdoor sculpture depicting Tomáš Masaryk, the founding President of Czechoslovakia. It was offered to the United States by the Czech Republic and was inaugurated on Embassy Row on 19 September 2002 in the presence of Czech President Václav Havel, former Slovak President Michal Kováč, and Prague-born former US Secretary of State Madeleine Albright.

The plaster for the statue was sculpted from life by Vincenc Makovský, shortly before Masaryk's death in 1937. Long housed in the National Gallery in Prague, it was only cast into bronze in 1968 during the Prague Spring but was not erected at the time.

The small public park in which the statue stands, a triangle surrounded by Q Street NW, 22nd Street NW, and Massachusetts Avenue, was designed by landscape architect Roger G. Courtenay.

The memorial includes quotes from the Czechoslovak declaration of independence, drafted under Masaryk's direction in Washington and proclaimed by him on October 18, 1918 on the steps of Independence Hall in Philadelphia; and from a speech delivered by George H. W. Bush at Wenceslas Square in Prague in November 1990. Coincidentally, the monument is geographically close to the equestrian statue of Philip Sheridan, also on Embassy Row, sculpted by Gutzon Borglum who assisted Masaryk in drafting the Declaration of Czechoslovakia in 1918.

See also
 Statue of Tomáš Garrigue Masaryk, Prague
 List of public art in Washington, D.C., Ward 2

References 

Czech-American culture in Washington, D.C.
Masaryk
Tomas Garrigue Masaryk
Tomas Garrigue Masaryk
Slovak-American history
Tomas Garrigue Masaryk